is a Japanese gunka released by Nippon Columbia in September 1944 during the Pacific War.  In the song, the chorus repeats the phrase after every verse.

The song was subtitled .

In March 1944, the student labour mobilisation order was issued, and the former four month labour period was conducted throughout the year; this song was written for that purpose.  For work orders directed at women, a song named  was written.

The national chorus aired this song through the broadcast choir on 26 June 1944.

References

Japanese-language songs
1944 songs
Japanese patriotic songs